"The Pink Panther Theme" is a jazz composition by Henry Mancini written as the theme for the 1963 film The Pink Panther and subsequently nominated for the Academy Award for Best Original Score at the 37th Academy Awards but lost to the Sherman Brothers for Mary Poppins. The eponymous cartoon character created for the film's opening credits by David DePatie and Friz Freleng was animated in time to the tune. The tenor saxophone solo was played by Plas Johnson.

Overview
The tune was included on the film's soundtrack album (originally issued as RCA Victor LPM/LSP-2795) and available as a single (in the United States) in 1964; the single reached the Top 10 on the U.S. Billboard adult contemporary chart and won three Grammy Awards.

Various recordings of the composition appeared in the opening credits of all The Pink Panther films except A Shot in the Dark and Inspector Clouseau. It has also been used in theatrical shorts, television cartoons, commercials and other works in which the animated Pink Panther appears.

"The Pink Panther Theme", composed in the key of E minor, is unusual for Mancini's extensive use of chromaticism.

In his autobiography Did They Mention the Music?, Mancini talked about how he composed the theme music:

Personnel
Plas Johnson – tenor saxophone
Gene Cipriano, Harry Klee, Ronny Lang, Ted Nash – flute, saxophones
Frank Beach, Conrad Gozzo, Jack Sheldon, Ray Triscari – trumpets
Karl DeKarske, Dick Nash, Jimmy Priddy – trombones
John Halliburton – bass trombone
Al Hendrickson – guitar
Larry Bunker, Frank Flynn – vibes and percussion
Jimmy Rowles – piano
Rolly Bundock – bass
Shelly Manne – drums
Pete Jolly – accordion
Ramon Rivera – congas, percussion

Other versions
From 1976 to 1991, the theme also served as the think music for Safe Crackers, a pricing game featured on the American game show The Price Is Right.

In the 1978 film Revenge of the Pink Panther, the theme, and much of the soundtrack from this entry in the series, draw heavily from the disco sound of the late 1970s. The theme itself was reworked to include a more dancy bassline, electric piano, and guitar solo. A similar treatment was given to 1983's Curse of the Pink Panther, where it had more synthesized instruments.

The theme was used in John McLaughlin and Al Di Meola's live version of Chick Corea's Short Tales of the Black Forest, from the 1981 album Friday Night in San Francisco.

In the 1994 video game, Final Fantasy VI, the music for Zozo town. is based on the theme.

In the 1993 film Son of the Pink Panther, the theme was rearranged and performed by Bobby McFerrin in the opening titles. This version was unique in being the only one to be performed a cappella. The credits featured the theme in the traditional style, similar to its appearance in Return of the Pink Panther, with an electric keyboard bassline.

In the 1999 video game, Donkey Kong 64, the music for Snide H.Q. is based on the theme.

In the 2000 video game, Wario Land 3, the music for Vampire Wario is based on the theme.

The first episode of the Idol Defense Force Hummingbird anime series makes use of a cover version of the theme in a scene where two reporters sneak into the bedroom of protagonists Satsuki and Yayoi Toreishi for a "close-up" scoop.

Actresses Drew Barrymore, Lucy Liu and Cameron Diaz and dance troupe and music group The Pussycat Dolls danced to the theme in the film Charlie's Angels: Full Throttle.

Christophe Beck rearranged the music for the 2006 reboot and its sequel, The Pink Panther 2 – Paul Oakenfold remixed the theme song for the 2006 film.

In 2007, saxophonist Dave Koz recorded a version for his album At the Movies.

The theme was featured in the film The Life and Death of Peter Sellers (2004).

The rearranged guitar version of Henry Mancini's Pink Panther theme were used from the short-lived Pink Panther and Pals series in 2010, composed by David Ricard.

Certifications

References 

The Pink Panther
American jazz songs
Compositions by Henry Mancini
Songs written for films
Film theme songs
Animated series theme songs
1960s jazz standards
1963 songs
1964 singles
Jazz compositions in E minor
RCA Records singles
1960s instrumentals